The 1997 Spanish Grand Prix (formally the XXXIX Gran Premio Marlboro de España) was a Formula One motor race held on 25 May 1997 at the Circuit de Catalunya in Montmeló, Spain. It was the sixth race of the 1997 Formula One World Championship.

The 64-lap race was won from pole position by Canadian Jacques Villeneuve, driving a Williams-Renault. Frenchman Olivier Panis finished second in a Prost-Mugen-Honda, six seconds behind Villeneuve, having only started 12th. Another Frenchman, Jean Alesi, finished third in a Benetton-Renault.

The win, Villeneuve's third of the season, put him back into the lead of the Drivers' Championship by three points from German Michael Schumacher, who finished fourth in his Ferrari.

Race summary 
Michael Schumacher, having started 7th, ended the first lap in 2nd position, and was challenging Villeneuve in the Williams for the lead. However, Schumacher, in the spare Ferrari, was unable to stay with the leader and was starting to slow the cars behind him. By lap 13, the gap between him and Villeneuve was approximately 20 seconds, and a train of cars consisting to David Coulthard, Jean Alesi, Mika Häkkinen, Heinz-Harald Frentzen, and Johnny Herbert was behind him. His lap times were approximately 1:26 while Villeneuve's was 1:22.

In this high tyre wearing race, especially for the Goodyear tyres, the first pit stops started at approximately lap 14, with the final one being on lap 25, which was Olivier Panis, in his finely balanced Prost with Bridgestone tyres. Soon after, beginning from lap 29, three stop runners were starting to pit for the 2nd time. This enabled Panis to gain positions, and by lap 34, he was 4th, and closing on Alesi and Coulthard who were 2nd and 3rd respectively. Soon after, Panis overtook Coulthard, who was on inferior Goodyear tyres, in a fine move on the approach to turn 1. Panis managed to jump to 2nd place ahead of Alesi in the pits.

Panis was gaining on the leader, Villeneuve, by approximately 1.5 seconds per lap. By the end of lap 49, the gap was 10.8 seconds, from 13 seconds at the end of lap 47. However, during lap 50, Panis was held up by traffic, firstly Ralf Schumacher's Jordan and then the Ferrari of Eddie Irvine. With marshals not waving the blue flags, Irvine failed to let Panis through, and thus allowing Jean Alesi and Michael Schumacher to catch him up. When Irvine finally yielded on lap 57, the gap between Panis and Villeneuve was back up to 16.1 seconds. Irvine later received a stop-go penalty for his actions. After Panis cleared the traffic, he was lapping 1.5 to 2 seconds faster than the leader and managed to close the gap to less than 6 seconds by the end of the race, but it was too late and Villeneuve took his 3rd victory of the season. This was Panis's final podium finish in Formula One.

Classification

Qualifying

Race

Championship standings after the race

Drivers' Championship standings

Constructors' Championship standings

References 

Spanish Grand Prix
Spanish Grand Prix
Grand Prix
Spanish Grand Prix